Zavarzinia compransoris is a Gram-negative soil bacterium that comprises the only current member of the genus Zavarzinia. It is named after the Russian microbiologist Georgi Alexandrovich Zavarzin. Zavarzinia is motile by using a polar flagellum. The cells are curved rod-shaped.

References

External links
Type strain of Zavarzinia compransoris at BacDive -  the Bacterial Diversity Metadatabase

Rhodospirillales
Bacteria described in 1974